is an English tort law and UK labour law case, which held that a worker can have more than one employer at the same time, who will be vicariously liable for the worker.

Facts
Viasystems Ltd, a printed circuit board manufacturer with two factories in Tyneside, sued for damages for a flood, caused while Thermal Transfer Ltd had installed an air conditioning in their factory on Eldon Street, South Shields. Thermal Transfer Ltd subcontracted to S&P Darwell Ltd, which subcontracted to CAT Metalwork Services, which hired young Darren Strang. Darren made ‘a foolish mistake on the spur of the moment’ by climbing down from a roof, where he was sent by his workmate to get fittings, through a duct. He was meant to use crawling boards and roof purlins. The duct collapsed, hit a sprinkler, and flooded the site. Viasystems sued Thermal, S&P Darwell and CAT Metalwork, while Thermal brought an action for contribution against S&P Darwell and CAT Metalwork.

Judgment
The Court of Appeal held that the defendants were jointly and equally liable, and suggested that the entity which most directly employed Darren was liable first.

May LJ noted that Prof Atiyah Vicarious Liability in the Law of Torts (1967) 156 in a chapter called ‘The Borrowed Servant’ suggested that both the general and temporary employer could be considered vicariously liable. After reviewing the history and noting that different jurisdictions diverged (Pennsylvania though in particular allows dual liability) He noted that multiplicity of claims (the old justification) is no longer an impediment in a modern context (at 49). So the control test would be applied and under the Civil Liability (Contribution) Act 1978 section 2 each of the second and third defendants (S&P Darwell and CAT Metalwork) would be liable in equal share, because they were entitled and obliged to control. He said the following.

Rix LJ (at 79-80) thought that the control test would be sufficient, and cited the idea that vicarious liability is a doctrine there because the employer ‘benefits’ (while May LJ spoke of risk spreading, at 55). He noted (at 76) that there was (1) a principle that a servant could not have two masters (2) that there was a danger of a multiplicity of actions. He said the following.

See also
English tort law
UK labour law

Notes

References
PS Atiyah, Vicarious Liability in the Law of Torts (1967)

English tort case law
Court of Appeal (England and Wales) cases
2005 in case law
2005 in British law